Miles Long (born November 4, 1968) is an American pornographic film director, producer, pornographic actor, writer and record label owner.

Career
Long began working as a cameraman and director of photography for Michael Ninn. Long branched out into mainstream TV in 2007 as the Director of Photography of the television series Untold Stripclub Confessions. In 2011 he trademarked his stage name and successfully litigated against a company that used his stage name to market a product without his permission. In April 2020 he was interviewed by Newsweek magazine regarding the effect of the COVID-19 pandemic on his industry. In 2021 he began to write articles as a columnist for NightMoves Magazine interviewing stars he knew personally for interviews which allowed him to show a more personal side of the girls he was interviewing. He continues to make appearances on Radio, having been on LATalkRadio with Amber Lynn as well as Vivid Radio on SiriusXM with Christy Canyon & Lisa Ann. In June 2021 he appeared live on UK TV show This Morning  and talked about his career, life, and love life. The TV interview and its related articles were also covered by the Daily Mirror and LADBible As of 2022 he has been inducted into the AVN, NightMoves, Urban X and XRCO Halls of Fame, won the NightMoves Triple Play award for excellence in more than 1 field and also received a Lifetime Achievement Award.

Mainstream Endeavors
In 2021 Long began combining his photography, videography, and producing to make shows for the Lingerie Fighting Championships, the all women's MMA and Wrestling PPV event which launched its own Channel on the Roku network. His show, Modz & Bodz received numerous interviews discussing his passion for building custom show cars and show bikes when not pursuing his love for photography and film production. Interviews on the show appeared in publications worldwide including the US, the UK, Singapore, & India. Starting in 2022, Long began extensively shooting for Mainstream Magazines, with his photography featured in dozens of Covers, Layouts and in Centerfolds of well known Magazines worldwide including FHM and Playboy.

Awards and nominations

References

External links

 
 
 
 

American male pornographic film actors
American pornographic film directors
American pornographic film producers
Pornographic film actors from California
1968 births
Living people
Male actors from San Francisco
American cinematographers
American erotic photographers
Film directors from California